After securing a majority in the 1990 Maharashtra legislative elections, the incumbent Chief Minister Sharad Pawar was re-appointed on 4 March 1990. Pawar formed his third ministry, consisting of 15 cabinet ministers and 6 ministers of state. The cabinet continued until June 1991, when Pawar was replaced by Sudhakarrao Naik.

Government formation
In the 1990 legislative elections, the Pawar-led Congress party secured 141 out of the State's 288 seats. Pawar managed to form a majority government, with support from 10 Congress "rebels", or party members who contested elections as Independents.

List of ministers
Pawar's initial ministry was sworn in on 7 March 1990, and underwent an expansion on 25 January 1991:

References

Indian National Congress
1990 in Indian politics
P  
Cabinets established in 1990
Cabinets disestablished in 1991